Herbert Gruber (born 9 November 1942) is an Austrian bobsledder who competed in the late 1960s and early 1970s. He won a silver medal in the four-man event at the 1968 Winter Olympics in Grenoble and finished eighth in the two-man event at the 1972 Winter Olympics in Sapporo.

Gruber also won a bronze medal in the two-man event at the 1971 FIBT World Championships in Cervinia.

References
 Bobsleigh four-man Olympic medalists for 1924, 1932-56, and since 1964
 Bobsleigh two-man world championship medalists since 1931
 DatabaseOlympics.com profile
 Wallenchinsky, David (1984). "Bobsled: Two-man". In The Complete Book of the Winter Olympics: 1896 - 1980. New York: Penguin Books. p. 559.

1942 births
Austrian male bobsledders
Bobsledders at the 1964 Winter Olympics
Bobsledders at the 1968 Winter Olympics
Bobsledders at the 1972 Winter Olympics
Olympic bobsledders of Austria
Olympic silver medalists for Austria
Living people
Olympic medalists in bobsleigh
Medalists at the 1968 Winter Olympics